The USRA Light Mountain was a USRA standard class of steam locomotive designed under the control of the United States Railroad Administration, the nationalized railroad system in the United States during World War I.  This was the standard light freight locomotive of the USRA types, and was of 4-8-2 wheel arrangement in the Whyte notation, or 2′D1′ in UIC classification.

A total of 47 locomotives were built under the auspices of the USRA.

Original owners

USRA originals

Copies

None of the originals built by the USRA or any of the subsequent copies were preserved, being scrapped from 1943 to 1959.

References

USRA locomotives
4-8-2 locomotives
ALCO locomotives
Standard gauge locomotives of the United States
Railway locomotives introduced in 1918